Chanbaran (also Romanized as Chanbarān; also known as Chambarān) is a village in Rivand Rural District, in the Central District of Nishapur County, Razavi Khorasan Province, Iran. At the 2006 census, its population was 384, in 97 families.

References 

Populated places in Nishapur County